Gettinger is a surname of German origin. Notable people with the surname include:

Tim Gettinger (born 1998), American ice hockey player
Tom Gettinger (1868–1943), American baseball player

References

Surnames of German origin